Queso panela (panela cheese) is a white, fresh and smooth Mexican cheese of pasteurized cow's milk. It is also known as queso canasta or queso de la canasta. It is served most often as part of appetizer dishes such as nopal salads or quesadillas.  It is derived from the Greek word for basket cheese. The cheese also has similarities to the Indian cheese paneer.

It absorbs other flavors easily and is covered at times with a paste of garlic and chili pepper. Good, genuine, fresh panela inhabits a similar watery environment to mozzarella, and can be used in quite the same fashion.  It may also be fried, since it holds its shape and does not melt very easily.  It is used in many diverse Mexican foods, such as enchiladas or tacos, as well as in some variant preparations of guacamole.

Regional differences as well as different degrees of maturation yield a diverse variety of cheeses within the panela family. One remarkable regional variety is that of the evergreen mountain town Tapalpa.

Origin 
As is the case with many Mexican varieties of cheese, the exact origin of panela isn't entirely agreed upon. Some place its origin in the Balkan peninsula or the Mezzogiorno, where other rustic cheeses are moulded in baskets. Furthermore, the origin of the name is disputed as well. Those who attribute the cheese's origin to the aforementioned areas of Europe suggest that the name comes from the baskets of bread (pan in Spanish) used to mould the cheeses. Others, however, argue that the name was derived from its physical resemblance to piloncillo, another name for unrefined whole cane sugar which is commonly known as panela in large parts of Mexico.

Form and texture 
Producing it in sizes any larger than that becomes impractical, as the cheese would become deformed owing to its soft and extremely malleable consistency.

Fresh panela has a bright white colour and a bland flavor, as it is mostly unsalted.

See also 
 Queso blanco
 Oaxaca cheese
 List of cheeses

References 

Mexican cuisine
Mexican cheeses
Cow's-milk cheeses